Garagouz  is a 2010 film.

Synopsis 
Mokhtar earns his living as a puppeteer, aided by his son who is learning the job. Using his old van, he goes to schools scattered all over the Algerian countryside, encountering prejudice and obstacles on the way.

Awards 
 Dubai 2010 
 Cinemed 2010 
 Fespaco 2011 
 Milan 2011
 Busan 2011
 Limassol 2011
 Saguenay 2011
 Ischia 2011

References 

 

Algerian short films
2010 films